Illusions Live/Viretta Park is a combination live album and demo EP by Michale Graves. It was recorded on April 24, 2008 at club Bourbon in New Port Richie, Florida and July 8 and 9, 2008 in Bucharest, Romania, respectively.

Track listing

Info 
Audio CD (October 21, 2008)
Original release date: October 21, 2008
Number of discs: 1
Format: Live
Label: Screaming Crow

References 

Michale Graves albums
Live horror punk albums
2008 live albums